KLME (95.7 FM, "MyFM 95.7") is a radio station serving Langdon, North Dakota. The station is currently owned by Simmons Broadcasting. All four Simmons Broadcasting stations share studios at 1403 Third Street in Langdon, North Dakota.

Sometime in 2021, KLME dropped its "Rock Farm" classic rock format (which moved to KYTZ 106.7 FM Walhalla) and rebranded as "MyFM 95.7" with an unknown format.

References

External links

LME
Radio stations established in 1991
1991 establishments in North Dakota